Sterling College may refer to:

Sterling College (Kansas)
Sterling College (Vermont)

See also
Stirling Theological College